Primary legislation and secondary legislation (the latter also called delegated legislation or subordinate legislation) are two forms of law, created respectively by the legislative and executive branches of governments in representative democracies. Primary legislation generally consists of statutes, also known as 'acts', that set out broad  principles and rules, but may delegate specific authority to an executive branch to make more specific laws under the aegis of the principal act. The executive branch can then issue secondary legislation (often by order-in-council in parliamentary systems, or by regulatory agencies in presidential systems), creating legally enforceable regulations and the procedures for implementing them.

Australia 

In Australian law, primary legislation includes acts of the Commonwealth Parliament and state or territory parliaments. Secondary legislation, formally called legislative instruments, are regulations made according to law by the executive or judiciary or other specified bodies which have the effect of law. Secondary legislation amounts to about half of Commonwealth law by volume. Although it is made by the executive, secondary legislation is still scrutinised by parliament and can be disallowed by a resolution of either house of parliament.

Canada 
In Canadian law, primary legislation (also called statute law) consists of acts of the Parliament of Canada and the legislatures of the provinces, and of Orders in Council made under the Royal Prerogative. Secondary legislation (also called regulation) includes laws made by federal or provincial Order in Council by virtue of an empowering statute previously made by the parliament or legislature.

Civil law jurisdictions
In civil law systems, a parliament issues primary legislation, with lesser bodies granted powers to issue delegated legislation. Action for judicial review of the validity of secondary legislation may be brought before a court e.g. the constitutional court. 

For example in Finland, the practice is to delegate the making of secondary legislation (“decree”) mainly to the Finnish Government (the cabinet) as a whole, to individual ministries (made by the minister; e.g. where the change of legal position of persons is limited and technical), or to the President of the Republic (e.g. where implementing international treaty obligations do not require legislation). Delegation to government agencies is exceptional (e.g. when the need for regulation is technical and may change rapidly) and done with extra caution.

European Union 
Each member state of the European Union (EU) has its own laws, but EU law takes primacy in certain circumstances. The EU Treaties are the EU’s primary legislation. These include the founding treaty, the 1957 Treaty of Rome, and all subsequent treaties, such as the Maastricht Treaty, Nice Treaty, and Lisbon Treaty. Secondary legislation is enacted under the Treaties, taking various forms and can be either legislative or non-legislative.

The forms include binding regulations, directives, decisions, and non-binding recommendations and opinions:
 A regulation is a law which is binding in its entirety and directly applicable in all Member States without needing national implementation. EU citizens may have standing to pursue breaches of regulations and treaties, as in Van Gend en Loos v Nederlandse Administratie der Belastingen.
 A directive is addressed to the Member States as a framework for their legislation. It is "binding as to the result to be achieved", but Member States can choose their own form of implementation. EU citizens may have standing to challenge failures to implement, as in Francovich v Italy.
 A decision is a law that addresses a specific issue. Addressees may challenge a decision via judicial review. 

Legislative acts are enacted via the legislative procedure, initiated by the Commission, and ultimately adopted by the Council and European Parliament acting in concert, which may also involve consultation with the European Economic and Social Committee and the European Committee of the Regions.

Non-legislative acts include implementing and delegated acts, such as those adopted by the Commission in pursuance of policy, which may involve so-called comitology committees. The Commission may act quasi-judicially in matters of EU competition law, a power defined in Article 101 and Article 102 of the Treaty on the Functioning of the European Union.

Privileged parties, such as Member States, EU institutions, and those with specific standing, may initiate litigation to challenge the validity of secondary legislation under the Treaties.

Hong Kong

Subsidiary legislation in Hong Kong is made with powers delegated by a law enacted by the Legislative Council of Hong Kong.

United Kingdom

Primary legislation 
In the United Kingdom, primary legislation can take a number of different forms:

 An Act of Parliament.
 An Act of the Scottish Parliament, Measure or Act of the Senedd or Act of the Northern Ireland Assembly
 An Order in Council made under the Royal Prerogative
 Church of England Measures – the instruments by which changes are made to legislation relating to the administration and organisation of the Church.

Secondary legislation 

In the United Kingdom, secondary legislation (also referred to as delegated legislation or subordinate legislation) is law made by an executive authority under powers delegated by an enactment of primary legislation, which grants the executive agency power to implement and administer the requirements of that primary legislation.

Forms of secondary legislation in the United Kingdom include only:
 Statutory instruments – made in a variety of forms, most commonly Orders in Council, regulations, rules and orders. The form to be adopted is usually set out in the enabling Act.

EU tertiary legislation
The  European Union (Withdrawal) Act 2018 defines “EU tertiary legislation” in retained EU law after Brexit to mean:

According to the explanatory notes accompanying the Act, this is meant to cover delegated and implementing acts that were not enacted via the European Union legislative procedure.

United States 

The British English distinction between primary and secondary legislation is not used in American English, due to the American abhorrence of the British constitutional concept of the fusion of powers as inherently incompatible with due process and the rule of law (one of the great divergences between American and British political philosophy which led to the American Revolution).  In contrast, the United States Constitution imposes a strict separation of powers. Therefore, the word legislation is used to refer only to acts of the legislative branch, and never the executive or the judicial branches. In a 2013 majority opinion of the US Supreme Court, Associate Justice Antonin Scalia explained:

Act of Congress 
In the United States, the equivalent at the federal level to the British concept of primary legislation is an Act of Congress. A statute that delegates authority to promulgate regulations to an agency is called an authorizing statute or delegation of rulemaking authority.

Regulations "with the force of law" 

In the United States, a law promulgated by an executive branch agency of the US federal government pursuant to authority delegated by an Act of Congress is called a regulation or a rule — often with the qualifier that it is a rule given "the force of law" by the authorizing statute. 

The body of law that governs agencies' exercise of rulemaking powers is called "administrative law", which derives primarily from the Administrative Procedure Act (APA) and decisions interpreting it. In addition to controlling "quasi-legislative" agency action, the APA also controls "quasi-judicial" actions in which an agency acts analogously to a court, rather than a legislature.

See also

Notes

References

External links
Public general Acts of the Parliament of the United Kingdom
Secondary legislation at the Parliament of the United Kingdom

Law by type